The year 1568 in science and technology involved some significant events.

Botany
 Orto Botanico di Bologna botanical garden is created under the direction of Ulisse Aldrovandi.

Medicine
 Ane Breve Descriptioun of the Pest by Gilbert Skene, the first Scottish medical book, is published.

Births
 October 2 – Marin Getaldić, Ragusan mathematician (died 1626)
 date unknown – Nikolaus Ager, French botanist (died 1634)

Deaths
 July 13 – William Turner, English naturalist (born c. 1508)
 Garcia de Orta, Portuguese physician (born c. 1501)

 
16th century in science
1560s in science